John Paish (born 25 March 1948) is a former professional tennis player from England who competed for Great Britain. He is the son of tennis player and administrator Geoffrey Paish.

Paish played a Davis Cup tie for the Great British team in 1972, against France. He lost both his singles rubbers, to Pierre Barthes and Patrick Proisy, but won the doubles rubber, beside David Lloyd. It was also with Lloyd that he made the semi-finals of the 1973 Wimbledon Championships. He was runner-up to Jimmy Connors at the 1972 Queen's Club Championships.

Grand Prix career finals

Singles: 1 (0–1)

Doubles: 1 (0–1)

References

External links
 
 
 

1948 births
Living people
English male tennis players
People from Croydon
British male tennis players
Tennis people from Greater London